Francine Larivée (born 1942) is a Canadian artist who presented her figural imagery in conceptual art projects and full-scale sculptures.

Larivée graduated from the École des beaux-arts de Montréal in 1965, and received a BA degree in art history from the Université du Québec à Montréal in 1973. 

Her work is included in the City of Montreal public art collection and in the collections of the Musée national des beaux-arts du Québec and the National Gallery of Canada.

References

Living people
1942 births
20th-century Canadian women artists
21st-century Canadian women artists